Samuel W. Lewis (born c. 1845) was a Canadian-born American schoolteacher and state legislator in Mississippi. He represented Madison County, Mississippi in the Mississippi House of Representatives from 1884-1885.

He was born in Canada circa 1845 and arrived in the U.S. around 1868 and naturalized as a U.S. citizen September 14, 1876. He had a wife called Ida and they had three children. He was a Republican.

He and other “colored” House members made vigorous protest of accusation of corruption against them from the Watchman newspaper.

He was chairman of the Republican Executive Committee for the Seventh District.

See also
 African-American officeholders during and following the Reconstruction era

References

Republican Party members of the Mississippi House of Representatives
Year of birth uncertain
Year of death missing
Canadian emigrants to the United States
People from Madison County, Mississippi
Naturalized citizens of the United States
1840s births
Schoolteachers from Mississippi
Black Canadian politicians
19th-century African-American politicians
19th-century American politicians
19th-century American educators
19th-century African-American educators
African-American schoolteachers